Live at the Fillmore East 2-11-69 is a double live album by the Grateful Dead recorded during the Live/Dead tour on February 11, 1969, at the Fillmore East in New York City. The first disc represents the early show that night, the second the late show. The Dead opened for Janis Joplin. This album contains the first Grateful Dead CD release of the Beatles' "Hey Jude".

Track listing
Disc one - early show
"Good Morning Little Schoolgirl" (Williamson) – 9:19
"Cryptical Envelopment" (Garcia) – 1:55 →
"The Other One" (Weir, Kreutzmann) – 6:01 →
"Cryptical Envelopment" (Garcia) – 6:58 →
"Doin' That Rag" (Garcia, Hunter) – 5:28
"I'm a King Bee" (Moore) – 5:19 →
"Turn On Your Lovelight" (Joseph Scott, Deadric Malone) – 17:07
"Hey Jude" (Lennon, McCartney) – 8:23

Disc two - late show
Introduction by Bill Graham – 1:19
"Dupree's Diamond Blues" (Garcia, Hunter) – 3:57
"Mountains of the Moon" (Garcia, Hunter) – 4:50 →
"Dark Star" (Garcia, Kreutzmann, Lesh, McKernan, Weir, Hunter) – 12:29 →
"St. Stephen" (Garcia, Lesh, Hunter) – 7:50 →
"The Eleven" (Lesh) – 6:09 →
"Drums" (Kreutzmann, Hart) – 2:43 →
"Caution (Do Not Stop on Tracks)" (Grateful Dead) – 13:26 →
"Feedback" (Grateful Dead) – 4:03 →
"And We Bid You Goodnight" (traditional) – 9:05
"Cosmic Charlie" (Garcia, Hunter) – Hidden track, tape runs out mid-song

Personnel 
Grateful Dead
Tom Constanten – organ
Jerry Garcia – lead guitar, vocals
Mickey Hart – drums
Bill Kreutzmann – drums
Phil Lesh – bass guitar, vocals
Ron "Pigpen" McKernan – percussion, harmonica, vocals
Bob Weir – rhythm guitar, vocals

Production
John Cutler – producer,  mixing
Phil Lesh – producer,  mixing
Bob Matthews – engineer, recording
Dick Latvala – Club Front
Jeffrey Norman – Club Front
Gecko Graphics – design
Amalie R. Rothschild – photography
Joshua Light Show – light images
Gary Lambert – CD booklet notes

Charts
Album - Billboard

Notes 

Live at the Fillmore East albums
Grateful Dead live albums
1997 live albums
Albums produced by Phil Lesh
Grateful Dead Records live albums